Geisel is a river of Saxony-Anhalt, Germany. The source of the Geisel, the Geiselquell, is located in the village of Sankt Micheln just west of Mücheln.

Origin of name

It is probable that the name is related to Geusa, a small village in the Geisel valley dating back to the early 9th century, but since both names date back to the days of Charlemagne, the original spelling and etymology have been lost. One possibility is that the name originates from the Old High German gewi, from the Gothic gavi, (neuter) or gaujis (genitive), a medieval term for a region within a country, often a former or actual province. The name may also originate from the Langobardic patronym Giso, a variant of Adalgis, meaning "noble, precious promise." Finally, the name may be related to the German geiß, meaning "goat".

See also
List of rivers of Saxony-Anhalt

Rivers of Saxony-Anhalt
Rivers of Germany